Sudhir Saha (1918–1998) was a wrestler, coach and wrestling administrator in India. He introduced Greco-Roman wrestling in India.

Sudhir Saha was the youngest son of Nandalal Saha and started wrestling at the age of six. Sudhir Saha was trained by his father Nandalal Saha, and subsequently by Ustad (meaning 'expert' in Hindi, a title commonly given to coaches) Majid Palwan from Lahore. Sudhir won the West Bengal State Wrestling Championship from the year 1935-1944 in the freestyle wrestling category. In the 1940 Senior National Wrestling Championship, Sudhir placed first in the middleweight category. After his wrestling career, Sudhir devoted his time to coaching and judge/refereeing.

During his early coaching career, K.P. Rai and Nirmal Bose, from Panchanan Bayam Samity, one of India's oldest wrestling club, represented India in the 1948 London Olympics. Four years later, the 1952 Helsinki Olympic training camp was held at Panchanan Bayam Samity. Two of Sudhir's trainees, Nirmal Bose and Niranjan Das, from Panchanan Bayam Samity represented India in the 1952 Helsinki Olympics.  One of Sudhir's trainees, K.D. Jadhav, won the bronze medal in the Bantam weight Category in the 1952 Helsinki Olympics.  This was independent India's first individual Olympic medal.

In 1957, Sudhir Saha attended the first Fédération Internationale des Luttes Associées (FILA) Judge/Referee clinic for technical officials in Paris, with the aim of officials coming together to discuss theory and practicals on wrestling techniques and minute details of officiating. This is where he obtained his international judge/referee license. 
In 1961, Sudhir Saha completed his International Coaching degree from Japan. He was also the Joint Secretary and Vice President of Wrestling Federation of India; General Secretary, West Bengal Wrestling Federation; and he was responsible for technical positions such as Mat Chairman, Member of the Selection Committee, Chairman of the Greco-Roman Style in India, and the Judge/Referee Association of India. He started his refereeing career in 1953, supervising more than 1500 wrestling bouts.  In the 1964 Summer Olympics held in Tokyo, Japan, Sudhir represented India as a wrestling judge/referee.

Greco-Roman Style Wrestling in India 

Under his supervision, the first Greco-Roman style wrestling competition was held in Calcutta at Panchanan Bayam Samity, one of India's oldest wrestling club. In 1965, at his initiative, Greco-Roman wrestling style was introduced in National Championship by the All India Wrestling Federation.

Achievements 

During Sudhir's coaching tenure, the following wrestlers received the following medals in International and World Championships, including 12 medals in the 1962 Asian Games (3 Gold, 6 Silver and 3 Bronze medals) and winning the team championship in the 1966 Commonwealth Games, with all seven Indian wrestlers winning medals (3 Gold, 2 Silver and 2 Bronze).

Below is a list of wrestlers and their achievements during Sudhir's coaching career.

During Sudhir's coaching career, wrestlers and officials from Panchanan Bayam Samity represented the State of West Bengal and India in International Championships.

Some Wrestlers and Officials are listed below  -

As a coach, judge and referee, Sudhir represented India at different International Championships. Below are some of Sudhir's achievements    -

Mithun Chakraborty
Actor, Mithun Chakraborty, learnt the art of wrestling under the supervision of Sudhir Saha at Panchanan Bayam Samity, Jorabagan Park, Kolkata.

References

1918 births
Indian wrestling coaches
Bengali sportspeople
Bengali Hindus
Sport wrestlers from Kolkata
Indian sports coaches
1998 deaths